"If You Can't Be Good (Be Good at It)" is a song written by Troy Seals and Blue Miller, and recorded by American country music artist Neal McCoy.  It was released in October 1997 as the first single from the album Be Good at It.  The song reached #22 on the Billboard Hot Country Singles & Tracks chart.

Critical reception
A review in Billboard noted that the production of Kyle Lehning gave the song a "different feel sonically" from McCoy's previous releases, but added that "it's still the personality in McCoy's voice that sells this type of tune."

Chart performance

References

1998 singles
1997 songs
Neal McCoy songs
Songs written by Troy Seals
Song recordings produced by Kyle Lehning
Atlantic Records singles